Donald Lee Stroud (born September 1, 1943) is an American actor, musician, and surfer. Stroud has appeared in over 100 films and 200 television shows.

Early years
Stroud is the son of vaudeville actor Clarence Stroud (of "The Stroud Twins" team) and singer Ann McCormack. He was born and raised in Honolulu, Hawaii by his mother and stepfather, Paul Livermore.

At the age of 16, Stroud earned a black belt in the Hawaiian martial art of Kajukenbo.

Stroud began surfing at the age of 3. As a surfer, he taught surfing while he was still in high school. In 1960 at the age of 17, Stroud won the Mākaha Junior Championship, and placed fourth overall in the Duke Kahanamoku International event.

While working at the Kahala Hilton beach as a lifeguard, producers hired Stroud to double for Troy Donahue's surfing sequences at Waikiki Beach for an episode of Hawaiian Eye. Afterwards, Donahue asked Stroud to move to Los Angeles to become an actor, while also serving as Donahue's fight double and bodyguard. After jobs parking cars, bouncing, and eventually managing at the Whisky A Go-Go in Hollywood, he received advice on getting a start as an actor from Sidney Poitier, who frequented the club. Poitier set Stroud up with Dick Clayton, who was also an agent for such actors as James Dean, Michael Douglas, Al Pacino and Burt Reynolds, among others.

Career

At 6'2", and around 200 pounds, Stroud often portrayed villains and tough guys.

Stroud's Hollywood film debut was a role in Games (1967) as Norman. That same year, he appeared in The Ballad of Josie (1967) as Bratsch.

In 1968, he signed with Universal Pictures on a five-film contract, and he took a roll in Madigan that same year. Stroud also appeared with Clint Eastwood in two films, Coogan's Bluff (1968) and Joe Kidd (1972).

Stroud co-starred in two Roger Corman films, Bloody Mama (1970) and Von Richthofen and Brown (1971). In the latter, he played Roy Brown opposite John Phillip Law's Baron von Richthofen. Corman used Lynn Garrison's Irish aviation facility. Garrison taught Stroud the rudiments of flying so that he could manage to take off and land the aircraft, making some of the footage more realistic.

Stroud and Robert Conrad performed in the speedboat chase through Fort Lauderdale in the film Live a Little, Steal a Little, also known as Murph the Surf (1975). In the film, he starred in the role of real-life jewel thief Jack Murphy. Conrad and Stroud also had a martial arts fight in Sudden Death (1975). Stroud would have another fight with Park Jong-soo in Search and Destroy (1979).

He starred in the horror/thriller Death Weekend (1976) (aka The House By the Lake), and had a supporting role in the cult horror film The Amityville Horror (1979) as Father Bolen. Other films in the genre include The Killer Inside Me (1976), and Sweet Sixteen (1983).

In The Buddy Holly Story (1978), he co-starred as the late musician's drummer, while actually playing the drums live in front of two or three thousand kids brought in by buses, recording the soundtrack directly using 24-track recording trucks at the venue.

In James Bond he played a villain in the film Licence to Kill (1989).

On television, his debut came in 1967 in the Barry Sullivan NBC western series The Road West as Nino. Being under contract at Universal, Stroud appeared in Barnaby Jones, Cannon, Charlie's Angels, Ironside, Hawaii Five-O, Marcus Welby, M.D., Starsky & Hutch, and The Streets of San Francisco, among others. Stroud had many other guest appearances, including The Fall Guy, Gunsmoke, Hotel, and The Virginian. He had a reoccurring role as Mike Varrick in the miniseries Mrs. Columbo (1979-1980) which starred Kate Mulgrew.

He played Captain Pat Chambers in Mickey Spillane's Mike Hammer and The New Mike Hammer with Stacy Keach. In the television pilot movie Gidget's Summer Reunion (1985) he played The Great Kahuna, and also revised the role in series The New Gidget (1986). He also has roles in Nash Bridges (1996–2001) and Pensacola: Wings of Gold (1996–2000).

In 2011, he made a brief appearance in the new Hawaii Five-0. Stroud played a bartender in the second season's fourth episode, "Mea Makamae" (meaning "Treasure" in Hawaiian).

Personal life

On September 16, 1970, during a low-level sequence flying a two-seat SV.4C Stampe biplane across Lake Weston, a duck flew through the propeller's arc, striking the pilot Garrison in the face, knocking him unconscious. The aircraft flew into five power lines, snap rolled and plunged inverted into Ireland's large Liffey River. Stroud rescued the unconscious Garrison, treading water until rescue crews found them almost an hour later. Stroud was unhurt, but Garrison required 60 stitches to close a head wound.

Sometime in 1989 or 1990, on the street in Greenwich Village, New York City, Stroud tried to help a man who was being mugged. During the confrontation, Stroud was stabbed several times, suffering partial paralysis in the face, and losing the use of one eye. The mugging victim fled.

Filmography
A partial filmography follows.

Film

 The Ballad of Josie (1967) - Bratsch
 Banning (1967) - Man at Golf Course (uncredited)
 Games (1967) - Norman
 Madigan (1968) - Hughie
 Journey to Shiloh (1968) - 'Todo' McLean
 What's So Bad About Feeling Good? (1968) - Barney
 Coogan's Bluff (1968) - James Ringerman
 Explosion (1969) - Richie Kovacs
 ...tick...tick...tick... (1970) - 'Bengy' Springer
 Bloody Mama (1970) - Herman Barker
 Angel Unchained (aka Hell's Angels Unchained)  (1970) - Angel
 Von Richthofen and Brown (1971) - Roy Brown
 Joe Kidd (1972) - Lamarr
 Slaughter's Big Rip-Off (1973) - Kirk
 Scalawag (1973) - Velvet
 Live A Little, Steal A Lot (1975) - Jack Murphy
 Taxi Driver (1976) - Policeman (uncredited)
 Death Weekend (1976) - Lep
 The Killer Inside Me (1976) - Elmer
 Hollywood Man (1976) - Barney
 Sudden Death (1977) - Dominic Aldo
 The Choirboys (1977) - Sam Lyles
 The Buddy Holly Story (1978) - Jesse Charles
 Search and Destroy (1979) - Buddy Grant
 The Amityville Horror (1979) - Father Bolen
 The Night the Lights Went Out in Georgia (1981) - Seth Ames
 Sweet Sixteen (1983) - Billy Franklin
 Armed and Dangerous (1986) - Sergeant Rizzo
 Two to Tango (1988) - James Conrad
 Licence to Kill (1989) - Colonel Heller
 Twisted Justice (1990) - Luther Pontelli
 Down the Drain (1990) - Dick Rogers
 Cartel (1990) - Tony King
 Mob Boss (1990) - Legrand
 The King of the Kickboxers (1990) - Anderson
 Prime Target (1991) - Manny
 The Roller Blade Seven (1991) - Desert Maurader
 Return of the Roller Blade Seven (1992) - Conga Man
 The Legend of the Roller Blade Seven (1992) - Kabuki Devil
 Return to Frogtown (1992) - Brandy Stone
 The Divine Enforcer (1992) - Otis
 The Flesh Merchant (1993) - Delambre
 It's Showtime (1993) - Banger
 Cyber Seeker (1993) - Isaac
 Carnosaur 2 (1995) - Ben Kahane
 Soldier Boyz (1995) - Gaton
 Precious Find (1996) - Loo Seki
 Little Bigfoot (1997) - McKenzie
 Wild America (1997) - Stango
 Perdita Durango (Dance with the Devil) (1997) - Santos
 The Haunted Sea (1997) - Chief Foster
 Detonator (1998) - 'Whip' O'Leary
 Land of the Free (1998) - Repairman (uncredited)
 Sutures (2009) - Voightman
 Django Unchained (2012) - Sheriff Bill Sharp 
 Glen Now and Then (2017) - Glen (Short) (Completed)

Television

References

External links
 To Smile & Play the Villain: An Interview with Don Stroud – January 2001
 
 

1943 births
Male actors from Hawaii
20th-century American male actors
American male film actors
American surfers
American male television actors
American kajukenbo practitioners
Living people
Male actors from Honolulu
Playgirl Men of the Month
Survivors of aviation accidents or incidents